The chloroplast NADH dehydrogenase F (ndhF) gene is found in all vascular plant divisions and is highly conserved.  Its DNA fragment resides in the small single-copy region of the chloroplast genome, and is thought to encode a hydrophobic protein containing 664 amino acids and to have a  mass of 72.9 kDa.

Application 

The ndhF fragment has been a very useful tool in phylogenetic reconstruction at a number of taxonomic levels.

See also 
 Chloroplast
 Chloroplast DNA
 RuBisCO
 NADPH dehydrogenase (quinone)

References 

Photosynthesis
EC 4.1.1
EC 1.6.5
Oxidoreductases
NADPH-dependent enzymes